Apowa is a residential town in the Western region of Ghana. It is about 10 kilometres westwards from Takoradi   the regional capital.

Boundary
The town is bounded to the west by Funko and on the east by Apremodo

Notable place
The St. Mary's Boys' School, a second cycle institution is the main thing for which the town is popular aside from its dormitory status. The school was established in 1947. It initially was a teacher training institution before it was converted to a secondary school. Famous people associated with school include Robert Mugabe, president of Zimbabwe who taught in the school as a tutor in the early 1960s.

References

Populated places in the Western Region (Ghana)